Kanner syndrome, officially childhood autism, was a neurodevelopmental diagnosis before the release of the DSM-5 and ICD-11. It has been superseded by autism spectrum disorder. In daily speech it is often referred to as "classic autism", or "Kanner autism."

Even though the official name was always "childhood autism" this term was seldom used since all forms of autism develop in childhood and persist throughout the entire life of the patient. The term "autism", "Kanner syndrome/autism" or "low functioning autism" was often used to refer to classic autism. After DSM-V/ICD-11 the term "autism" has become more commonly used in reference to the autism spectrum more broadly. Do observe that a diagnosis of classic autism does not in any way have to mean that the patient is "low functioning". This is yet another misleading term used in reference to the diagnosis.

Parents often noticed signs of autism during the first three years of their child's life.

Autism was hypothesized to be caused by a combination of genetic and environmental factors, with genetic factors thought to heavily predominate. Controversies surround other proposed environmental causes; for example, the vaccine hypothesis, which although disproved, continues to hold sway in certain communities. Contemporary diagnostic manuals include only one diagnosis - autism spectrum disorder (ASD) - which includes classic autism along with Asperger syndrome and pervasive developmental disorder not otherwise specified (PDD-NOS).

Globally, classic autism was estimated to affect 24.8 million people .

Characteristics
Classic autism is a highly variable neurodevelopmental disorder whose symptoms first appear during infancy or childhood, and generally follows a steady course without remission. Autistic people may be severely impaired in some respects but average, or even superior, in others. Overt symptoms gradually begin after the age of six months and become established by age two or three years. Some autistic children experience regression in their communication and social skills after reaching developmental milestones at a normal pace. It was said to be distinguished by a characteristic triad of symptoms: impairments in social interaction, impairments in communication, and repetitive behavior. Other aspects, such as atypical eating, are also common but are not essential for diagnosis. Individual symptoms of autism occur in the general population and appear not to associate highly, without a sharp line separating pathologically severe from common traits.

Social development

Autistic people have social impairments and often lack the intuition about others that many people take for granted. Unusual social development becomes apparent early in childhood. Autistic infants show less attention to social stimuli, smile and look at others less often, and respond less to their own name. Autistic toddlers differ more strikingly from social norms; for example, they have less eye contact and turn-taking, and do not have the ability to use simple movements to express themselves, such as pointing at things. Three- to five-year-old autistic children are less likely to exhibit social understanding, approach others spontaneously, imitate and respond to emotions, communicate nonverbally, and take turns with others. However, they do form attachments to their primary caregivers. Most autistic children displayed moderately less attachment security than neurotypical children, although this difference disappears in children with higher mental development or less pronounced autistic traits. Children with high-functioning autism have more intense and frequent loneliness compared to non-autistic peers, despite the common belief that autistic children prefer to be alone. Making and maintaining friendships often proves to be difficult for autistic people. For them, the quality of friendships, not the number of friends, predicts how lonely they feel. Functional friendships, such as those resulting in invitations to parties, may affect the quality of life more deeply.

Communication
Differences in communication may be present from the first year of life, and may include delayed onset of babbling, unusual gestures, diminished responsiveness, and vocal patterns that are not synchronized with the caregiver. In the second and third years, autistic children have less frequent and less diverse babbling, consonants, words, and word combinations; their gestures are less often integrated with words. Autistic children are less likely to make requests or share experiences, and are more likely to simply repeat others' words (echolalia) or reverse pronouns. Deficits in joint attention may be present - for example, they may look at a pointing hand instead of the object to which the hand is pointing. Autistic children may have difficulty with imaginative play and with developing symbols into language. It is also thought that autistic and non-autistic adults produce different facial expressions, and that these differences could contribute to bidirectional communication difficulties.

Repetitive behavior

Autistic individuals can display many forms of repetitive or restricted behavior, which the Repetitive Behavior Scale-Revised (RBS-R) categorizes as follows.
 Stereotyped behaviors: Repetitive movements, such as hand flapping, head rolling, or body rocking.
 Compulsive behaviors: Time-consuming behaviors intended to reduce the anxiety that an individual feels compelled to perform repeatedly or according to rigid rules, such as placing objects in a specific order, checking things, or handwashing.
 Sameness: Resistance to change; for example, insisting that the furniture not be moved or refusing to be interrupted.
 Ritualistic behavior: Unvarying pattern of daily activities, such as an unchanging menu or a dressing ritual.
 Restricted interests: Interests or fixations that are abnormal in theme or intensity of focus, such as preoccupation with a single television program, toy, or game.

No single repetitive or self-injurious behavior seems to be specific to autism, but autism appears to have an elevated pattern of occurrence and severity of these behaviors.

Other symptoms
Autistic individuals may have symptoms that are independent of the diagnosis. An estimated 0.5% to 10% of individuals with classic autism show unusual abilities, ranging from splinter skills such as the memorization of trivia to the extraordinarily rare talents of prodigious autistic savants. Sensory abnormalities are found in over 90% of autistic people, and are considered core features by some, although there was no good evidence that sensory symptoms differentiate autism from other developmental disorders. An estimated 60–80% of autistic people have motor signs that include poor muscle tone, poor motor planning, and toe walking.

Causes

It was presumed initially that there was a common cause at the genetic, cognitive, and neural levels for classic autism's characteristic triad of symptoms. However, over time, there was increasing evidence that autism was instead a complex and highly heritable disorder whose core aspects have distinct causes which often often co-occur.

Although theories regarding vaccines lack convincing scientific evidence, are biologically implausible, and originated from a fraudulent study, parental concern about a potential vaccine link with autism (and subsequent concern about ASD) has led to lower rates of childhood immunizations, outbreaks of previously controlled childhood diseases in some countries, and the preventable deaths of several children.

Diagnosis
Diagnosis of classic autism was based on behavioral symptoms, not cause or mechanism.

Classification
Classic autism was listed as autistic disorder in the fourth edition of the American Psychiatric Association's diagnostic manual, as one of the five pervasive developmental disorders (PDDs). However, the PDDs were collapsed into the single diagnosis of Autism Spectrum Disorder in 2013, and the WHO's diagnostic manual ICD-11 (which had listed it as childhood autism in its previous edition) followed suit a few years later. Classic autism was said to be characterized by widespread abnormalities of social interactions and communication, severely restricted interests, and highly repetitive behavior.

Of the PDDs, Asperger syndrome was closest to classic autism in signs and likely causes; Rett syndrome and childhood disintegrative disorder share several signs with it, but were understood to potentially have unrelated causes; PDD not otherwise specified (PDD-NOS; also called atypical autism) was diagnosed when the criteria were not met for one of the other four PDDs. People would usually attract a diagnosis of Asperger syndrome rather than classic autism if they showed no substantial delay in language development, but early language ability was found to be a poor predictor of outcomes in adulthood.

Prognosis and management

There is no known cure for autism, and very little research addressed long-term prognosis for classic autism. Many autistic children lack social support, future employment opportunities or self-determination.

The main goals when treating autistic children are to lessen associated deficits and family distress, and to increase quality of life and functional independence. In general, higher IQs are correlated with greater responsiveness to treatment and improved treatment outcomes. Services should be carried out by behavior analysts, special education teachers, speech pathologists, and licensed psychologists.

Intensive, sustained special education programs and behavior therapy early in life often improves functioning and decreases symptom severity and maladaptive behaviors; claims that intervention by around age three years is crucial are not substantiated.

No known medication relieves autism's core symptoms of social and communication impairments.

Education

Early, intensive ABA therapy has demonstrated effectiveness in enhancing communication and adaptive functioning in preschool children; it is also well-established for improving the intellectual performance of that age group. It is not known whether treatment programs for children lead to significant improvements after the children grow up, and the limited research on the effectiveness of adult residential programs shows mixed results.

Alternative medicine
Although many alternative therapies and interventions were used, few are supported by scientific studies. Treatment approaches have little empirical support in quality-of-life contexts, and many programs focus on success measures that lack predictive validity and real-world relevance. Some alternative treatments placed autistic individuals at risk. For example, in 2005, a five-year-old child with autism was killed by botched chelation therapy (which is not recommended for autism as risks outweigh any potential benefits).

Epidemiology

Globally, classic autism was understood to affect an estimated 24.8 million people . After it was recognised as a distinct disorder, reports of autism cases substantially increased, which was largely attributable to changes in diagnostic practices, referral patterns, availability of services, age at diagnosis, and public awareness (particularly among women).

Several other conditions were commonly seen in children with autism. They include:
 Intellectual disability. The percentage of autistic individuals who also met criteria for intellectual disability has been reported as anywhere from 25% to 70%, a wide variation illustrating the difficulty of assessing intelligence of individuals on the autism spectrum. In comparison, for PDD-NOS the association with intellectual disability was much weaker, and by definition, the diagnosis of Asperger's excluded intellectual disability.
 Minor physical anomalies are significantly increased in the autistic population.
 Preempted diagnoses. Although the DSM-IV ruled out the concurrent diagnosis of many other conditions along with autism, the full criteria for Attention deficit hyperactivity disorder (ADHD), Tourette syndrome, and other of these conditions were often present. As a result, modern ASD allows for these diagnoses.

History

The New Latin word autismus (English translation autism) was coined by the Swiss psychiatrist Eugen Bleuler in 1910 as he was defining symptoms of schizophrenia. He derived it from the Greek word autós (αὐτός, meaning "self"), and used it to mean morbid self-admiration, referring to "autistic withdrawal of the patient to his fantasies, against which any influence from outside becomes an intolerable disturbance". The word autism first took its modern sense in 1938 when Hans Asperger of the Vienna University Hospital adopted Bleuler's terminology autistic psychopaths in a lecture in German about child psychology. Asperger was investigating Asperger syndrome which, for various reasons, was not widely considered a separate diagnosis until 1981, although both are now considered part of ASD. Leo Kanner of the Johns Hopkins Hospital first used autism in English to refer to classic autism when he introduced the label early infantile autism in a 1943 report. Almost all the characteristics described in Kanner's first paper on the subject, notably "autistic aloneness" and "insistence on sameness", are still regarded as typical of the autistic spectrum of disorders. Starting in the late 1960s, classic autism was established as a separate syndrome.

It took until 1980 for the DSM-III to differentiate autism from childhood schizophrenia. In 1987, the DSM-III-R provided a checklist for diagnosing autism. In May 2013, the DSM-5 was released, updating the classification for pervasive developmental disorders. The grouping of disorders, including PDD-NOS, autism, Asperger syndrome, Rett syndrome, and CDD, has been removed and replaced with the general term of Autism Spectrum Disorder.

References

External links 

1910s neologisms
Articles containing video clips
Communication disorders
Neurological disorders in children
Pervasive developmental disorders
Wikipedia medicine articles ready to translate